GX 339-4 is a moderately strong variable galactic low-mass X-ray binary (LMXB) source and black hole candidate that flares from time to time. From spectroscopic measurements, the mass of the black-hole was found to be at least of 5.8 solar masses.

During the outbursts GX 339-4 shows evolution of quasi-periodic oscillations (QPOs). In the rising phase the QPO frequency monotonically increase as the CENBOL propagates closer to the black hole and in the declining phase the QPO frequency monotonically decreases since the CENBOL recedes away from the black hole after viscosity is decreased. The frequency variation is thus well modeled by the propagating and oscillating shock in the sub-Keplerian flow. The entire spectrum also fits very well using two component advective flow solution.

A strong, variable relativistic jet, emitting from radio to infrared wavelengths was observed by several studies.

References

External links
 http://iopscience.iop.org/1538-3881/123/3/1741: Optical Observations of the black hole candidate GX 339-4 Cowely et al.
 http://www.universetoday.com/89102/big-ol-black-hole-jets/: Big Ol’ Black Hole Jets

X-ray binaries
Ara (constellation)
Arae, V821